Bjelogorci may refer to:
 Bjelogorci (Pale)
 Bjelogorci (Rogatica)